Iven is a municipality in the Vorpommern-Greifswald district, in Mecklenburg-Vorpommern, Germany.

Notable residents
Georg Detlev von Flemming (1699–1771), Saxon-Polish general

References

Vorpommern-Greifswald